Salov or Šalov is a Slavic male surname, its feminine counterpart is Salova or Šalova. It may refer to
Igor Salov (born 1983), Russian rower
Nenad Šalov (born 1955), Croatian football midfielder
Serhiy Salov (born 1979), Canadian pianist of Ukrainian origin
Valery Salov (born 1964), Russian chess grandmaster